Rolandas Kazlas (born 11 May 1969 in Molėtai) is a Lithuanian actor, comedian and theater director. Lithuanian National Culture and Arts prize winner in 2009.

Biography
Rolandas Kazlas was born in 1969 in Molėtai town, Lithuania. In 1987 he graduated from Molėtų high school.
In 1991, Kazlas graduated from the Lithuanian Academy of Music and Theatre with a degree in acting. He became a Valstybinis Jaunimo Teatras actor in 1993. Currently a free director, creator and thinker. Played and continues to play at Lithuanian National Drama Theatre and Meno Fortas.

Characterized as eccentric, comic, playful and improvising, but is spectacular playing dramatic roles as well. Generally a very composed and thoughtful man, with years of acting and directing experience.

Notable roles

Theatre
 Piladas - "Electricity" ("Elektra").                   1993 Director: Irena Kriauzaitė
 Karlėnas - “Siuvėjų dienos Silmačiuose”.               1993 Director: Povilas Gaidys
 Utešitelnas - "Gamblers" (”Lošėjai”).                  1993 Director: Hamish Glen
 Karalaitis - “Karalaitis amato mokėsi”.                1993 Director: Aurelija Čeredėjevaitė
 Estebizas - “Orfėjas”.                                 1994 Director:  Jokūbas Vilius Tūras
 Sanča Pansa - “Don Kichotas”.                          1994 Director: Saimonas Povelas
 Patronas Julijus - “Saga apie Gestą Berlingą”.         1996 Director: Prytas Pedajasas
 Kristianas - “Sirano”.                                 1996 Director: Ignas Jonynas
 Rotmistras - "Father" (“Tėvas”).                       1997 Director: Jonas Vaitkus
 Pitu - “Memuarai”.                                     1998 Director: Dalia Tamulevičiūtė
 Foma Opiskinas - "Stepančikovo dvaras".                1998 Director: Foma Opiskinas
 Jagas - "Otelas".                                      2000 Director: Eimuntas Nekrošius
 Kunigaikštis Gavrila - “Dėdulės sapnas”.               2003 Director: Cezaris Graužinis
 Kaligula - “Kaligula”.                                 2004 Director: Ignas Jonynas
 Lebiadkinas - "Demonai. Nelabieji. Apsėstieji. Kipšai".2005 Director: Algirdas Latėnas
 Astrovas, Michailas Lvovičius “Dėdė Vania”.            2005 Director: Jonas Vaitkus
 Karalius Ignotas - "Ivona, Burgundo kunigaikštytė".    2007 Director: Jonas Vaitkus
 Andželas - "Jei taip, tai šitaip".                     2007 Director: Paul Eugene Budraitis
 Napoleonas Šereika - "Patriots" ("Patriotai").         2008 Director: Jonas Vaitkus
 Migelis - "Raiši žirgai nešuoliuoja".                  2008 Director: Ignas Jonynas
 Ligonis Gromovas - "Palata".                           2009 Director: Rolandas Kazlas
 Teisininkas - "Raštininkas Bartlbis".                  2010 Director: Rolandas Kazlas
 Dantė - "Dieviškoji komedija".                         2013 Director: Eimuntas Nekrošius

Movies
 Kids from American Hotel ("Vaikai iš Amerikos Viešbučio") (1990)
 Jazz ("Džiazas") (1992)
 Utterly Alone ("Vienui vieni") (2004)
 'Balkonas (2008)
 I Want to Live''  (2018)

Television
He also made appearances in "Dviračio žinios" (LNK) and is the author and the main character of the television series "Nekenčiu reklamos" - showed since 2000 on BTV.

Directed plays
 Geležis ir sidabras 2009
 Palata 2009
 Raštininkas Bartlbis 2010
 Pamoka 2019

References

  KAZLAS Rolandas. Kaunas Theater of Drama.

Living people
1969 births
People from Molėtai
Recipients of the Lithuanian National Prize
Lithuanian Academy of Music and Theatre alumni
Lithuanian male stage actors
Lithuanian male film actors
Lithuanian male television actors
Lithuanian directors
20th-century Lithuanian male actors
21st-century Lithuanian male actors